Gren Jones may refer to:

Gren Jones (cartoonist) (1934–2007), Welsh cartoonist
Gren Jones (footballer) (1932–1991), English footballer